Marinicauda salina is a Gram-negative and aerobic bacterium from the genus of Marinicauda which has been isolated from a marine solar saltern.

References 

Caulobacterales
Bacteria described in 2019